Navigator is a science fiction novel by British writer Stephen Baxter, the third in his alternate history series Time's Tapestry.

Synopsis

The novel, which begins in AD 1070, ends in AD 1492 as Christopher Columbus sails westward.

See also 

Emperor
Conqueror
Weaver

External links

2007 British novels
British alternative history novels
British science fiction novels
Novels by Stephen Baxter
2007 science fiction novels
Victor Gollancz Ltd books